Rachid El-Haddak (born 11 December 1973) is a Moroccan boxer. He competed in the men's heavyweight event at the 2004 Summer Olympics.

References

1973 births
Living people
Moroccan male boxers
Olympic boxers of Morocco
Boxers at the 2004 Summer Olympics
Place of birth missing (living people)
Heavyweight boxers